Draparnaldiopsis is a genus of green algae in the family Chaetophoraceae.

The genus name of Draparnaldiopsis is in honour of Jacques Philippe Raymond Draparnaud (1772–1804), who was a French naturalist, malacologist and botanist.

The genus was circumscribed by Gilbert Morgan Smith and Frederick Detlev Klyver in Trans. Amer. Microscop. Soc. Vol.48 on page 200 in 1929.

References

External links

Chaetophorales genera
Chaetophoraceae